"Live Show" is a live television episode of the American series 30 Rock.

Live Show may also refer to:
Live television
Live Show (film), a 2000 Filipino film

See also
"Live from Studio 6H" another live episode of 30 Rock that aired in 2012